Lluvia (Spanish for "Rain"; born August 9, 1984 in Mexico City, Mexico) is the ring name of a Mexican luchadora enmascarada, or masked female professional wrestler currently working for the Mexican professional wrestling promotion Consejo Mundial de Lucha Libre (CMLL) portraying a tecnico ("Good guy") wrestling character. Lluvia's real name is not a matter of public record, as is often the case with masked wrestlers in Mexico where their private lives are kept a secret from the wrestling fans. Lluvia is a second-generation wrestler, the daughter of Sangre Chicana.

Personal life
Lluvia is the daughter of professional wrestler Andrés Durán Reyes, better known under the ring name Sangre Chicana ("Chicano Blood") and the sister of Sangre Chicana, Jr. unlike her father or her brother Lluvia decided to work as a tecnico while her father was one of the most famous rulebreakers (also known as a rudo) of the 1980s. She is the niece of wrestler Herodes and the cousin of Consejo Mundial de Lucha Libre (CMLL) wrestler Herodes, Jr. She studied psychology at a University before training for her professional wrestling career.

Professional wrestling career
Lluvia was originally trained by her father, Sangre Chicana before making her professional wrestling debut on April 30, 2008. She would become a regular for CMLL only a few months later, continuing her wrestling training under CMLL trainers El Satánico and Último Guerrero. CMLL decided to give Lluvia more exposure in the early part of 2009, booking her in an eight-woman torneo cibernetico where all eight women would risk their mask on the outcome of the match, with the last person eliminated would be forced to unmask per the Luchas de Apuestas ("Bet match") rules. In addition to Lluvia the match also included La Magnifica, La Seductora, Estrella Magica, Princesa Sujei, Atenea, Coral, Silueta. The match came down to Lluvia and La Magnifica, with Lluvia winning the match and her first "trophy" the mask of her opponent. On June 14, 2011 Lluvia received her first ever chance to compete for the CMLL World Women's Championship, losing to champion La Amapola two falls to one during a show celebrating the 52nd anniversary of Arena Coliseo. On December 6, 2011 during a CMLL show Lluvia and Luna Mágica defeated La Comandante and Zeuix to win the Reina World Tag Team Championship, a title promoted by Japanese wrestling promotion Universal Woman's Pro Wrestling Reina. The victory meant that the two traveled to Japan to defend the titles in early 2012. On January 29, 2012 Lluvia and Luna Mágica successfully defended the titles against Casandra and La Silueta. Near the end of their tour of Japan, on March 24, the team lost the championship to Zeuxis and Mima Shimoda.

Championships and accomplishments
Consejo Mundial de Lucha Libre
Mexican National Women's Tag Team Championship (1 time, current) - with La Jarochita
2022 CMLL Universal Amazons Championship Winner

Universal Woman's Pro Wrestling Reina
Reina World Tag Team Championship (1 time) – with Luna Mágica

Luchas de Apuestas record

Footnotes

References

1984 births
Mexican female professional wrestlers
Living people
Masked wrestlers
Professional wrestlers from Mexico City
Unidentified wrestlers
21st-century professional wrestlers
Reina World Tag Team Champions
Mexican National Women's Tag Team Champions